Maurice Webb may refer to:

Maurice Webb (architect) (1880–1939), English architect
Maurice Webb (politician) (1904–1956), British Labour politician